Septién is a surname.  Notable people with the name include:

Carlos Septién (footballer), Mexican footballer
Mariusz Stepien (born 1976), metal detector enthusiast in Scotland.
Rafael Septién (born 1953), Mexican-born player of American football

See also
Stepien (disambiguation), includes a list of people with surname Stepien